The Teda language, also known as Tedaga, is a Nilo-Saharan language spoken by the Teda, a northern subgroup of the Toubou people that inhabits southern Libya, northern Chad and eastern Niger.

Along with the more populous southern dialect of Daza, the northern Teda dialect constitutes one of the two varieties of Tebu. However, Teda is also sometimes used for Tebu in general.

References

 Barth, Heinrich 1854. Schreiben an Prof. Lepsius über die Beziehung der Kanori- und Teda-Sprachen. Zeitschrift fur Erdkunde, 2: 372-74, 384-87.
 Chonai, Hassan 1998. Gruppa teda-kanuri (centraľnosaxarskaja sem’ja jazykov) i ee genetičeskie vzaimootnošenija (ėtimologičeskij i fonologičeskij aspekt). Moskva: PhD. Dissertation (Rossijskij gosudarstvennyj gumanitarnyj universitet).
 Haggar, Inouss & K. Walters 2005. Lexique tubu (dazaga)-français et glossaire français-tubu. Niamey: SIL, Niger.
 Jourdan, P. 1935. Notes grammaticales et vocabulaire de la langue Daza. London: Kegan, Paul, Trench & Trubner.
 Le Cœur, C. 1950. Dictionnaire ethnographique téda, précédé d’un lexique français-téda. Dakar: IFAN.
 Le Cœur, C., and M. Le Cœur 1956. Grammaire et textes teda-daza. Memoires de l’IFAN 46. Dakar: Institut Français d’Afrique Noire.
 Lukas, Johannes 1951-52. Umrisse einer ostsaharanischen Sprachgruppe. Afrika und Übersee, 36: 3-7.
 Lukas, Johannes 1953. Die Sprache der Tubu in der zentralen Sahara. Berlin: Akademie Verlag.
 Audio records of Daza-Teda languages, 1946 (being digitized soon) : http://archives.crem-cnrs.fr/archives/collections/CNRSMH_I_1950_002/

Tebu languages
Saharan languages
Languages of Chad
Languages of Niger
Languages of Nigeria
Languages of Libya
Toubou people